Thoracolophotos is a genus of moths of the family Erebidae. The genus was erected by George Thomas Bethune-Baker in 1906.

Species
Thoracolophotos albilimitata Hampson, 1926 Borneo
Thoracolophotos ekeikei Bethune-Baker, 1906 New Guinea
Thoracolophotos javanicus Roepke, 1935 western Java

References

Calpinae
Noctuoidea genera